Hanoch Dov Milwidsky (born 1973) is an Israeli politician who currently serves as a member of the Knesset for Likud.

Biography
Milwidsky worked as a legal advisor to the Bnei Baruch organisation.

Previously a member of Yesh Atid, prior to the 2022 Knesset elections Milwidsky was placed twenty-sixth on the Likud list.  He was elected to the Knesset as the party won 32 seats.

References

External links

1973 births
Living people
Jewish Israeli politicians
Likud politicians
Members of the 25th Knesset (2022–)